Cavan railway station was located  by rail from Adelaide on the now closed Northfield branch line.

History
The Stockade line (later known as the Northfield railway line), running from Dry Creek through to Stockade railway station, was first opened in 1857. Cavan station was probably opened along this line in 1914, and was located at the corner of Port Wakefield Road and Goldsborough Road. The station was named after the suburb of Cavan, a namesake of a local hotel first licensed in 1855, which itself was named after Cavan in County Cavan, Republic of Ireland.

Cavan station was closed to commuter traffic on 29 May 1987, but some cattle trains still used the stock ramp sidings near Cavan and Pooraka stations until the mid 1990s.

References

Disused railway stations in South Australia
Railway stations in Australia opened in 1857
Railway stations closed in 1987
1987 disestablishments in Australia